Dodds Prison, previously called Her Majesty's Prison Dodds until the dissolution of the Barbadian Crown, is a prison in Barbados at Dodds, St. Philip.
 It was built as a replacement for HM Glendairy Prison, which has been permanently decommissioned.

In 2015 it was reported that the prison's medical unit did not have its own ambulance or full-time medical staff.

References

External links

Saint Philip, Barbados
Prisons in Barbados